See also New York–New Jersey Highlands for the northwestern part of the state.

Highlands is a borough in Monmouth County, in the U.S. state of New Jersey. As of the 2010 United States census, its population was 5,005, a decline of 92 (−1.8%) from the 2000 Census, which had seen an increase of 248 (+5.1%) from the 1990 Census. The eastern part of the town is on a high bluff that overlooks Sandy Hook and the Atlantic Ocean, from which the borough derives its name. Atop this bluff are the Navesink Twin Lights.

Highlands was incorporated as a borough by an act of the New Jersey Legislature on March 22, 1900, from parts of Middletown Township. Additional parts of Middletown Township were annexed in 1914.

Highlands is part of the Bayshore Regional Strategic Plan, an effort by nine municipalities in northern Monmouth County to reinvigorate the area's economy by emphasizing the traditional downtowns, residential neighborhoods, maritime history, and the natural environment of the Raritan Bayshore coastline.

On October 29, 2012, Hurricane Sandy struck the eastern seaboard of the United States, making landfall just north of Atlantic City. The borough was heavily damaged when a storm surge of nearly  swept in from the bay beginning October 28. Most homes and businesses, including the Bahrs Landing and Lusty Lobster fishery were either damaged or totally destroyed. The borough lost several police cars and its fire station was destroyed.

History
Giovanni da Verrazzano explored the area known today as Highlands in 1525. During the next two centuries, the Highlands area would welcome English and Dutch settlers.

The oldest route to the eastern coast of the United States is the Minisink Trail which started on the upper Delaware River, came through northern New Jersey and ended at the Navesink River. Navesink means "good fishing spot" in the native tongue at the time.  The trail was used by Native Americans, such as the Algonquin and Lenni Lenapi tribes.  They came from all over New Jersey to spend the summer fishing and finding clams. The Newasunks, Raritans, and Sachem Papomorga (or Lenni Lenapis) were the most prevalent tribes and stayed the longest. These were the tribes which mostly traded with early settlers.

One year after Verrazzano explored the area, Portuguese explorer Estevan Gomez visited the Highlands of Navesink and created the first maps of the area. These were the maps in which Sandy Hook was first drawn and called "Cabo de Arenas" or "Cape of Sands."

In 1609, Henry Hudson sailed into the Sandy Hook Bay and wrote: "This is very good land to fall in with and a pleasant land to see. Our men went on land, so they went up into the woods and saw great stores of very goodly oaks and some currants". One of Hudson's crew became the first man killed by Native Americans who were frightened by his scouting party.

Many years after Hudson's trip to the area, the Highlands of Navesink saw a number of Dutch who traded with the Navesink Indians and prepared nautical charts. William Reape, one of the Dutch, made a bargain with the local natives to trade land in exchange for rum, blankets and gunpowder.

Eventually, the Dutch settlers named the land "Rensselaer's Hoeck," but British settlers took over and renamed the settlement "Portland" in 1664. The group purchasing the land included James Hubbard, John Bawne, John Tilton Jr., Richard Stout, William Goulding and Samuel Spear.

Three years later, in 1677, Richard Hartshorne purchased a  tract of land from the Native Americans which provided him with control of nearly all of Sandy Hook and Highlands which was then called "Portland Poynt." Hartshorne and his family became the first permanent settlers of the area.

Some early settlers soon realized the importance Highlands and Sandy Hook would have in the defense of the country.  People in Highlands and Sandy Hook could warn New York of any enemies approaching by sea and also to help guide ships into New York harbor. In 1762, New York merchants purchased a four-acre site from the Hartshorne family for a light house. Two years later, the Sandy Hook Light House was lighted for the first time.

The hills of the Highlands of Navesink and Sandy Hook also played an important role during the American Revolutionary War.  It was a vital strategic site for the British and Colonial Armies.  When the British fleet arrived close to Sandy Hook in 1776, sympathizers with the British built fortifications and with the help of the British were able to hold Sandy Hook for the remainder of the Revolutionary War.  The Loyalists stayed in control of Sandy Hook even after the war was ended by the surrender of Cornwallis at Yorktown on October 19, 1781.

Captain Joshua Huddy was the eldest of seven brothers and a member of the Monmouth Continental Militia.  He pursued gangs of Tory (Loyalist) refugees who plundered the area searching for American rebels.  The refugees made Huddy a target and tried to kill him several times.  Unfortunately, one of the Loyalists' raids from Sandy Hook ended with setting Huddy's house on fire. Huddy agreed to surrender if they would help him to put out the fire. They agreed and took Huddy as a prisoner.  The fire from the house had attracted the attention of Huddy's neighbors and the local militia raced after the Tories, catching them before they could reach their boats at Black Point in Rumson.  In the fight that ensued, Huddy escaped.

However, two years later the Loyalists captured Huddy and brought him to Gravelly Point in Highlands where he was allowed to write his will.  Then Huddy was hanged for the death of Captain Philip White who had been captured by Rebels earlier in Long Branch and shot while being transported to Freehold.  Huddy was not involved in the shooting, as he was in a British prison at the time, but was hanged anyway.  His body was carried by patriots to Freehold and buried.  Today, a monument in Huddy Park honors Captain Joshua Huddy.

In 1796, the first hotel in the Highlands of Navesink was built and many other hotels were built until the War of 1812.  Two years later, the tourism began to grow and new hotels were built on Sandy Hook and on the hills of Highlands.  In addition, a number of new homes were being built and visitors were coming to Highlands by the boatload.

Author James Fenimore Cooper, author of Last of the Mohicans, also wrote Water Witch, a novel which was inspired by his visits to Highlands.  Walt Whitman, one of America's most famous poets, celebrated his excursions to Highlands in his journals and a group of his poems entitled, "Fancies at Navesink."

By 1880, numerous hotels, beach pavilions and private clubs were flourishing in Highlands.  It was the beginning of a glorious era for the small town on the Shrewsbury River. Trains and steamships brought vacationers to celebrate post-Civil War prosperity.

New York theatrical producers and famous actors built summer homes in Highlands.  The area became so popular that Harper's Magazine sent a journalist down nearly every summer in the 1870s and 1880s to write about the community and its people.

The Seashore Railroad had been built on the Sandy Hook peninsula during 1865 and a ferry service was established to take passengers across the river from Highlands to his hotel on Sandy Hook. Then a bridge was constructed in 1872 and the ferry service ceased operations. It was constructed at a cost of $35,000 and opened in 1872, but was closed for three years when a schooner ran into it in 1875. By 1883, a railroad came to Atlantic Highlands and in 1892 the old draw bridge at Highlands was torn down and a new railroad bridge was built by the New Jersey Central Railroad Company for their coastal line. This new bridge for rail, vehicular, and foot traffic was opened in 1892.

On Lighthouse Hill were the Twin Lights which is one of the most historic sites in the nation.  Built in 1862, it was the first twin light house, the first electric powered light, the first glimpse of America for incoming ships, the first in the nation to use the Fresnel lens, the first to use wireless telegraphy, and the site of the first experiments with radar.

Light House Hill (also known as Beacon Hill) was employed as a site for a beacon as early as 1746, when England was in conflict with France in the War of Austrian Succession, and the colonies of both were up for grabs. The beacon—whale oil burned in pots—was not only to welcome sailors, but to warn citizens that the French were coming up the harbor and it was time to take down the musket from over the fireplace. During the Revolutionary War, the beacon served the same purpose, only Britain was the enemy.

In 1899, Guglielmo Marconi, the inventor of wireless telegraphy demonstrated his invention at the Twin Lights so the New York Herald could be the first to have news of the 1899 America's Cup races to be run off the New Jersey Coast.

By the 1920s, Highlands was a popular tourist destination.  By 1932, however, century-long steamboat operations on the Shrewsbury and Navesink Rivers came quickly to an end.

Before World War II, the northern tower was the first place where experiments with radar were held. So successful were the tests that, soon after the war, radar was the major tool of navigation and the government decided to decommission the Twin Lights and abandon the building as an operative light house.

During 1900, Highlands was incorporated and passed an ordinance prohibiting horses, cows and pigs from running loose on the streets. It also ordered that three-inch hemlock and chestnut planking be used as curbs along the officially designated streets.

By 1920 the "manufacture, sale or transportation of intoxicating liquors" was prohibited. However, "rum-running" was a common practice for New Jersey's beachfront and Highlands became the main port for the infamous trade. Highlands also had great boat-building facilities which could produce boats faster than the authorities could catch. The Jersey Skiff, designed and built in Highlands, became the primary craft to be used in the smuggling operations.

Highlands became known for sport fishing in the 1920s.  Today, countless boats can be seen in the rivers, bays and ocean to catch fluke, bluefish, striped bass or whiting.

Clamming was an important activity here for the Native Americans and the first settlers learned from them.  A writer in 1890 reported that clams were to Parkertown what the whale once was to Nantucket.

Gertrude Ederle spent all of her summers in Highlands and learned to swim at the beach on Miller Street.  She would swim from Sandy Hook to the Highlands Bridge in two hours and forty minutes to train for her famous English Channel swim in 1926.  She became the first woman to swim the English Channel, and also the first to be given a ticker-tape parade on Broadway. Ederle attended the 1975 dedication of a park in Highlands named in her honor.

During 1975, all military installations on Sandy Hook (except for the U.S. Coast Guard) were decommissioned and the land was given to the National Park Service to become the Gateway National Recreation Area.

Geography

According to the United States Census Bureau, the borough had a total area of 1.39 square miles (3.59 km2), including 0.74 square miles (1.92 km2) of land and 0.65 square miles (1.67 km2) of water (46.47%).

Unincorporated communities, localities and place names located partially or completely within the borough include Parkertown and Waterwitch (also spelled as "Water Witch").

The borough borders the Monmouth County municipalities of Atlantic Highlands, Middletown Township and Sea Bright.

Climate
The climate in this area is characterized by hot, humid summers and generally mild to cool winters.  According to the Köppen Climate Classification system, Highlands has a humid subtropical climate, abbreviated "Cfa" on climate maps.

Demographics

Census 2010

The Census Bureau's 2006–2010 American Community Survey showed that (in 2010 inflation-adjusted dollars) median household income was $75,291 (with a margin of error of +/− $12,503) and the median family income was $80,430 (+/− $7,353). Males had a median income of $63,686 (+/− $6,479) versus $46,641 (+/− $9,013) for females. The per capita income for the borough was $42,737 (+/− $4,647). About 11.5% of families and 12.3% of the population were below the poverty line, including 30.3% of those under age 18 and 1.9% of those age 65 or over.

Census 2000
As of the 2000 United States census there were 5,097 people, 2,450 households, and 1,193 families residing in the borough. The population density was 6,689.2 people per square mile (2,589.4/km2). There were 2,820 housing units at an average density of 3,700.9 per square mile (1,432.6/km2). The racial makeup of the borough was 95.10% White, 1.59% African American, 0.33% Native American, 1.00% Asian, 0.59% from other races, and 1.39% from two or more races. Hispanic or Latino of any race were 4.06% of the population.

There were 2,450 households, out of which 19.9% had children under the age of 18 living with them, 34.4% were married couples living together, 10.5% had a female householder with no husband present, and 51.3% were non-families. 41.7% of all households were made up of individuals, and 9.0% had someone living alone who was 65 years of age or older. The average household size was 2.08 and the average family size was 2.90.

In the borough the population was spread out, with 18.8% under the age of 18, 7.3% from 18 to 24, 36.8% from 25 to 44, 25.8% from 45 to 64, and 11.3% who were 65 years of age or older. The median age was 39 years. For every 100 females, there were 100.4 males. For every 100 females age 18 and over, there were 98.0 males.

The median income for a household in the borough was $45,692, and the median income for a family was $50,985. Males had a median income of $50,296 versus $31,265 for females. The per capita income for the borough was $29,369. About 11.5% of families and 12.3% of the population were below the poverty line, including 20.0% of those under age 18 and 11.7% of those age 65 or over.

Government

Local government
Highlands is governed by a Faulkner Act, formally known as the Optional Municipal Charter Law, under the Small Municipality (Plan C) form of New Jersey municipal government, enacted by direct petition as of January 1, 1978. The borough is one of 18 municipalities (of the 564) statewide that use this form of government, which is only available to municipalities with a population below 12,000 at the time of adoption. The governing body is comprised of the Mayor and the four-member Borough Council, who are elected on an at-large basis in non-partisan voting to three-year terms on a staggered basis as part of the November general election, in a three-year cycle in which two council seats come up for election in each of two consecutive years followed by the mayoral seat up for vote in the third year. This form of government was adopted in 1956. In a 2014 referendum, voters changed the format and timing of elections from partisan in November to nonpartisan in May. In the November 2014 general election, voters approved a referendum shifting the borough's nonpartisan elections from May to November, with the first November nonpartisan municipal election taking place in 2015.

, the mayor of the Borough of Highlands is Carolyn Broullon, whose term of office ends December 31, 2022. Members of the Highlands Borough Council are Council President JoAnne Provenzano Olszewski (2023), Leo Cervantes (2024), Karen Chelak (2024) and Donald Melnyk (2023).

Federal, state and county representation
Highlands is in the 6th Congressional District and is part of New Jersey's 13th state legislative district. Prior to the 2011 reapportionment following the 2010 Census, Highlands was in the 11th state legislative district.

 

Monmouth County is governed by a Board of County Commissioners comprised of five members who are elected at-large to serve three year terms of office on a staggered basis, with either one or two seats up for election each year as part of the November general election. At an annual reorganization meeting held in the beginning of January, the board selects one of its members to serve as Director and another as Deputy Director. , Monmouth County's Commissioners are
Commissioner Director Thomas A. Arnone (R, Neptune City, term as commissioner and as director ends December 31, 2022), 
Commissioner Deputy Director Susan M. Kiley (R, Hazlet Township, term as commissioner ends December 31, 2024; term as deputy commissioner director ends 2022),
Lillian G. Burry (R, Colts Neck Township, 2023),
Nick DiRocco (R, Wall Township, 2022), and 
Ross F. Licitra (R, Marlboro Township, 2023). 
Constitutional officers elected on a countywide basis are
County clerk Christine Giordano Hanlon (R, 2025; Ocean Township), 
Sheriff Shaun Golden (R, 2022; Howell Township) and 
Surrogate Rosemarie D. Peters (R, 2026; Middletown Township).

Politics
As of March 23, 2011, there were 3,118 registered voters in Highlands, of whom 880 (28.2%) were registered Democrats, 728 (23.3%) registered Republicans and 1,509 (48.4%) unaffiliated. One voter was registered to another party.

In the 2012 presidential election, Democrat Barack Obama received 54.6% of the vote (1,044), ahead of Republican Mitt Romney with 43.8% (837), and other candidates with 1.6% (31), with 1,930 ballots cast by the borough's 3,294 registered voters (18 ballots were spoiled), for a turnout of 58.6%. In the 2008 presidential election, Obama received 51.3% of the vote (1,266), ahead of Republican John McCain with 44.9% (1,108) and other candidates with 1.7% (42), with 2,467 ballots cast by the borough's 3,451 registered voters, for a turnout of 71.5%. In the 2004 presidential election, Republican George W. Bush received 50.6% of the vote (1,230), outpolling Democrat John Kerry with 47.9% (1,164) and other candidates with 0.7% (25 votes), with 2,429 ballots cast by the borough's 3,431 registered voters, for a turnout of 70.8%.

In the 2013 gubernatorial election, Republican Chris Christie received 67.9% of the vote (960), ahead of Democrat Barbara Buono with 29.7% (419), and other candidates with 2.4% (34), with 1,442 ballots cast by the borough's 3,166 registered voters (29 were spoiled), for a turnout of 45.5%. In the 2009 gubernatorial election, Christie received 55.1% of the vote (887), ahead of Democrat Jon Corzine with 34.3% (553), Independent Chris Daggett with 7.1% (115) and other candidates with 2.4% (39), with 1,611 ballots cast by the borough's 3,216 registered voters, a 50.1% turnout.

Education

The Highlands School District serves public school students in pre-kindergarten through sixth grade at Highlands Elementary School. In the 2016–2017 school year, Highlands was tied for the 40th-smallest enrollment of any school district in the state, with 190 students. As of the 2018–2019 school year, the district, comprised of one school, had an enrollment of 192 students and 22.8 classroom teachers (on an FTE basis), for a student–teacher ratio of 8.4:1.

For seventh through twelfth grades, public school students attend Henry Hudson Regional High School, a comprehensive six-year high school and regional public school district that serves students from both Atlantic Highlands and Highlands.  As of the 2018–2019 school year, the high school had an enrollment of 331 students and 39.1 classroom teachers (on an FTE basis), for a student–teacher ratio of 8.5:1.  As of the 2018–2019 school year, the high school had an enrollment of 331 students and 39.1 classroom teachers (on an FTE basis), for a student–teacher ratio of 8.5:1. Seats on the high school district's nine-member board of education are allocated based on the population of the constituent municipalities, with five seats assigned to Highlands.

Transportation

Roads and highways

New Jersey State Route 36 is the main highway through Highlands. At the east end of the borough, Route 36 connects to Sea Bright by way of the Highlands-Sea Bright Bridge.

Public transportation
NJ Transit provides local bus transportation on the 834 route between the borough and Red Bank. Academy Bus offers bus service to the Port Authority Bus Terminal in Midtown Manhattan and to Wall Street.

SeaStreak offers ferry service to Manhattan at Conner's Ferry Landing. There are three morning trips, which stop at Pier 11/Wall Street and then the East 34th Street Ferry Landing. Six ferry trips return each weekday evening.

Popular culture
The Kevin Smith film Jersey Girl is set in Highlands, but was filmed in Paulsboro, New Jersey.

In addition, Highlands' ZIP code (07732) is featured in the opening titles of Mallrats, and is Dante's ZIP code in Clerks: The Animated Series, although it is misattributed in the show to nearby Leonardo.

Notable people

People who were born in, residents of, or otherwise closely associated with Highlands include:

 Gertrude Ederle (1905–2003), swimmer who was the first woman to swim across the English Channel, she learned to swim in Highlands during summers spent living in the borough
 Walt Flanagan (born 1967), comic book store manager, reality television personality, podcaster and comic book artist
 Bryan Johnson (born 1967), co-host of the Tell 'Em Steve-Dave! and star of Comic Book Men
 Jason Mewes (born 1974), actor who is best known for his role as Jay, the vocal half of the duo Jay and Silent Bob
 Frankie Montecalvo (born 1990), racing driver who was the 2015 Pirelli World Challenge GTA Driver's Champion and competes in the WeatherTech SportsCar Championship

References

External links

 
1900 establishments in New Jersey
Boroughs in Monmouth County, New Jersey
Faulkner Act (small municipality)
Jersey Shore communities in Monmouth County
Populated places established in 1900
Raritan Bayshore